William J. Kuehne [b. William J. Knelme] (October 24, 1858 – October 27, 1921) was an infielder in Major League Baseball who played from 1883 through 1892 for the Columbus Buckeyes (1883–84), Pittsburgh Alleghenys (1885–89), Pittsburgh Burghers (1890), Columbus Solons (1891), Louisville Colonels (1891–92), St. Louis Browns (1892) and Cincinnati Reds (1892). Listed at 5' 8", 185 lb., Kuehne batted and threw right-handed. He was born in Leipzig, which was part of the German Confederation.

Basically a third baseman, Kuehne was able to play all positions but pitcher and catcher. He enjoyed his best years with the Pittsburgh teams, hitting .299 in 1887 as he led the National League with 138 games played in 1888. From 1883 to 1888 he averaged 15.33 triples per season, with a career-high 19 in 1895. Then, in 1892, he played for the Colonels, Browns and Reds during the regular season. Technically, that's three clubs, but he did have two separate stints with the Browns, becoming one of few Major Leaguers to achieve this rare distinction.

In a 10-season career, Kuehne was a .232 hitter (996-for-4284) with 25 home runs and 404 RBI in 1087 games, including 536 runs, 145 doubles, 115 triples, and 151 stolen bases.

After his long career, Kuehne retired to pursue his long-time hobby of archaeology, working periodically in Cultural Resource Management under the pseudonym "P.Webb" in North Carolina for several years before returning to his hometown.  Kuehne died in Sulphur Springs, Ohio, three days after his 63rd birthday.

See also
List of Major League Baseball career triples leaders
List of players from Germany in Major League Baseball

Sources

Retrosheet

19th-century baseball players
Cincinnati Reds players
Columbus Buckeyes players
Columbus Solons players
Louisville Colonels players
Pittsburgh Alleghenys players
Pittsburgh Burghers players
St. Louis Browns (NL) players
Major League Baseball third basemen
Major League Baseball players from Germany
German emigrants to the United States
1858 births
1921 deaths
Atlanta Firecrackers players
Erie Blackbirds players
Minneapolis Millers (baseball) players
St. Thomas Saints players
Chatham Reds players
Fort Wayne Indians players
Columbus Buckeyes (minor league) players
Columbus Senators players
Detroit Tigers (Western League) players
Sportspeople from Leipzig